Vladimir Aleksandrovich Albitzky (16 June 1891 – 15 June 1952) was a Soviet/Russian astronomer and discoverer of minor planets. In modern English transliteration, his surname would be given as Al'bitskii or Al'bitsky. In the literature, he is sometimes referred to as W. A. Albizkij, however his surname usually appears in the literature as "Albitzky". His asteroid discoveries are credited as "V. Albitskij".

He came to the Simeiz Observatory (Симеиз) in Crimea in 1922, working with G. A. Shajn and G. N. Neujmin, and became head of the observatory in 1934. The Minor Planet Center credits him with the discovery of 10 asteroids during 1923–1925.

The Eunomia asteroid 1783 Albitskij, discovered by astronomer Grigory Neujmin at Simeiz Observatory in 1935, was named in his honor.

List of discovered minor planets

Papers by V.A. Albitzky 

The total number of papers by V.A. Albitzky is about 88 according to his File from the Archive of the Pulkovo Oservatory. Only 5 papers can be found at the ADS NASA, while the rest are given in a copy from the archiv by Alex Gaina, including a great part of the observations of asteroids.
 ADS NASA
 Gaina Alex: Papers by V.A. Albitzky
A Russian version of the work concerning radial velocities of 343 stars can be found at:
 The Danish National Library

See also

References

External links 
 A group of Russian astronomers in 1920. On the left- V.A. Albitzky
 V.A. Albitzky

1891 births
1952 deaths
Discoverers of asteroids
Soviet astronomers